Bart Verhaeghe, (born in 1965) is a Belgian entrepreneur. He became president of Club Brugge in 2011 and one year later he became the majority shareholder.  

He is also chairman of project developer UPLACE and former vice-chairman of the Royal Belgian Football Association. He also co-founded the independent think tank Itinera in 2006. 

Verhaeghe encourages entrepreneurship, among other things, with his passionate plea for more ambition and courage in our society. That's the key message in his book 'Durf!’ (Dare!) which was published by Van Halewyck in 2019.

Early life 
Verhaeghe was born into a Brabant family with West Flemish roots (father from Stuivekenskerke and mother from Ardooie). He grew up in Grimbergen and played soccer at KSC Grimbergen and Hoger Op Merchtem. After secondary school at the Jan van Ruusbroeck College in Laken, he studied law at the Catholic University of Leuven and obtained a Master of Business Administration at Vlerick Business School.

He started his career at KPMG, one of the Big Four accounting organizations. He resigned after nine months to start as an entrepreneur. At industrial building company Verelst, he developed project developer Eurinpro specialising in logistic real estate and of which he became CEO. This company grew substantially and was sold in 2006 to the Australian company Macquarie Goodman for 400 million Euro.

LakeSprings 
Verhaeghe invests in sports (Club Brugge), real estate (project development and real estate investments), private equity, listed shares and non-profit organisations (Itinera and the Anti-Cancer Fund). These investments are part of the family holding LakeSprings nv. As real estate investment, Verhaeghe bought the Castle of Bever from Count Eric de Villegas de Clercamp in 2004. The castle has been fully renovated and is surrounded by roughly 20 hectares of park area.

Real Estate: Verelst, Eurinpro and Uplace 
In 1992 Verhaeghe took his first steps in real estate when he met building contractor Luc Verelst. He acquired a stake in the industrial building company Verelst, from which Eurinpro later emerged. This company grew into a global player in logistic real estate. Verhaeghe also set up two real estate funds, Siref and Retail Estates. He used these investment companies to list his retail property and semi-industrial property on the stock market. In 2006, Eurinpro was sold to the Australian company Macquarie Goodman for 400 million Euro

Verhaeghe then set up the real estate company Uplace, specialised in developing innovative projects where living, working and relaxing go together. Near Brussels, Uplace develops a new workshop district called BROEKLIN, where training, production, consumption and circularity meet at a very central location in Belgium. The work shop district is designed by Professor and architect Alexander D’Hooghe.

Club Brugge 
In 2004, at the request of the Flemish government, Verhaeghe developed a feasibility study for schools and football stadiums. Subsequently, he was contacted by the then board of Club Brugge, which developed plans for a new stadium. Verhaeghe additionally developed a strategic vision for the first division. At the request of the board of directors at the time, Verhaeghe implemented the internal changes, became chairman and hired Vincent Mannaert to become CEO of Club Brugge. Mannaert leads the operational operations of Club, supported by a professional management team.

The Board of Directors was also subject to major changes: several entrepreneurs made their entry. At the end of 2012, the trade fund of the non-profit association Club Brugge K.V. was transferred to the limited liability company Club Brugge, to which an amount of 15 million euros was contributed. Verhaeghe became the majority shareholder.

Under  the management of Verhaeghe and Mannaert, Club Brugge grew to become one of Belgium's top clubs. From 2014 to 2022, it achieved the best results of all clubs in the Jupiler Pro League. During this period, it won the most games in regular competition (5 times), the most championship titles (5), it played two cup finals in which Club won one. In the same season, Club Brugge won 2 Super cups and also walked away with the most individual prizes (26). At the European level, over the last five years Club has played four times in the Champions League group stage.

Awards were not only won on the pitch, Club Brugge was also awarded with the work of the Club Brugge Foundation. The community activities - which receive annual structural support from Club Brugge nv - received the Pro League Football & Community Award (formerly called the Pro League+) in the 2014-'15, 2015-'16, 2017-'18 and 2020-'21 seasons. Club Gold Award), a recognition for the best CSR action in Belgian football. In the 2019-20 season, Club Brugge Foundation received two international prizes for the project 'De Beer and his Scarf', namely the More than Football Award [9] from the European for Football Development Network and the Professional Club - Community Award from the International Sports Awards. The Club Brugge Foundation uses the power and impact of football on society to make a positive contribution to society. It places an extra focus on the vulnerable groups within society and more specifically within the regions from which Club Brugge's supporters come. The operating resources of the Club Foundation mainly come from Club Brugge nv.

Over an eight-year period, Verhaeghe made turnover grow from 43 million Euro in 2011 to 137 million Euro in 2020. A new stadium will further enhance that growth. Since 2006, several locations have been proposed by the government for a new Club stadium, but legal appeals have continued to surface. At the beginning of 2020, the city council of Bruges and the board of Club Brugge announced that the location of the new stadium is planned on the current Olympia site. Club Brugge will build the stadium with its own resources, the city gives a long lease on the use of the grounds. As soon as the new stadium is ready (season '22-'23), the Jan Breydel Stadium can be demolished. Club offers the guarantee that Cercle Brugge can continue to play in the new stadium on the Olympiasite, until the association can start using another stadium. The permit for the new stadium on the Olympiasite was granted on October 6, 2021.

Belfius basecamp, the training complex of Club Brugge, is located in Westkapelle (Knokke-Heist). The first stone was laid on September 12, 2018, and ten months later, the A-team officially moved in.

On March 3, 2021, chairman Bart Verhaeghe and CEO Vincent Mannaert announced the intention to list Club Brugge on Euronext Brussels but this was postponed on March 25 due to market conditions.

On July 2, 2021, Club Brugge strengthened its ownership structure for future growth, with the entry of a new shareholder: Orkila Capital. As a growth equity investment fund with 15 years experience in sports, media, entertainment and consumer markets in Europe and the US, Orkila Capital will help Club Brugge to further flourish in the fields of marketing digitalization, intellectual property and content development and direct-to-consumer business strategies. Orkila Capital is providing a capital increase of 20 million € in Club Brugge’s further growth as a team and brand as well as acquiring shares from the existing shareholders for an amount of 30 million €.  as a result, Grizzly Sports NV (with major shareholder Bart Verhaeghe) will hold 71.89 % of the Club Brugge shares and Orkila Capital will hold 23,26 % of the Club Brugge shares.

Royal Belgian Football Association 

In 2013, the Pro League delegated Verhaeghe to the Executive Committee of the RBFA. Three years later he took up the position of director and became Vice Chairman. Together with former chairman Gérard Linard, Verhaeghe reorganised the association which made a loss of 8 million Euro in 2016, into a financially healthy federation. Verhaeghe and Linard rolled out a code of ethics for all RBFA employees and partners. The rules of good governance were adopted with a professional management team that, under the leadership of CEO Peter Bossaert, was given the keys to manage the operational management of the RBFA.
Verhaeghe was also chairman of the Technical Committee. Together with Mehdi Bayat and Chris Van Puyvelde he appointed Roberto Martínez as national coach. Verhaeghe was head of delegation at the World Cup in Russia where the Red Devils won bronze.

Verhaeghe was also chairman of the Technical Committee. Together with Mehdi Bayat and Chris Van Puyvelde he appointed Roberto Martínez as national coach. Verhaeghe was head of delegation at the World Cup in Russia where the Red Devils won bronze.

In June 2019, Verhaeghe resigned from the RBFA so that he could focus on Club Brugge and his other professional activities.

Books 
 Zeg niet aan mijn moeder dat ik ondernemer ben...ze denkt dat ik op zoek ben naar een job, 2003. (Don't tell my mother I'm an entrepreneur, she thinks I'm looking for a job)
 Durf! Pleidooi voor meer ambitie en lef, 2019 (Dare! A plea for more ambition and courage)

References 

Living people
Belgian sports executives and administrators
Belgian businesspeople
1965 births